Stefano Castellani (born 16 January 1992) is an Italian footballer who plays as a forward for Aglianese.

Career
On 17 August 2013 Castellani was signed by Renate.

Ahead of the 2019/20 season, Castellani joined Aglianese.

References

External links

1992 births
Living people
Footballers from Florence
Italian footballers
Association football forwards
Serie B players
Serie C players
Serie D players
Empoli F.C. players
A.S.D. Barletta 1922 players
A.C. Renate players
Forlì F.C. players
S.S.D. Correggese Calcio 1948 players
S.S.D. Sanremese Calcio players
Scandicci Calcio players